Gilles Renne is a French jazz-fusion guitarist and composer born in Arles on October 21, 1954.

Biography 
Gilles grew up in a family where art and culture hold an important place his father is the painter Guy Renne his mother Thérèse Renne teaches ancient letters and is a writer. He first started playing the guitar as an autodidact then obtained his admission to the Guitar Institute of Technology in Los Angeles from which he graduated in 1980. In 1984 he won the first prize for guitar at the national jazz competition in Paris, La Défense.

Career 
Gilles Renne met saxophonist Philippe Sellam with whom he successively founded the jazz quartet Sellam-Renne Quartet in 1986, then in 1992 the "African Project", a group resulting from multiple musical encounters during tours in black Africa. This group which mixes Jazz with traditional African music will notably include the balafon player Aly Keïta, Linley Marthe (bass),  Thierry Arpino (drums). At the beginning of the 90s, he will be the guitarist of Bext'tet the group of organist Emmanuel Bex and will also be part of the Big Band "Quoi de neuf docteur".

In 1999, he founded with organist Philippe Petit the quartet "Myster Hyde", then "Jazz Runners", with which he toured in 2012 in Venezuela which resulted in a feature film "Venez jouer là".

In 2006, with Philippe Sellam, he created "No Spirit", a "Jazz-groove" quartet, including Fred Dupont (Hammond organ) and Christophe Bras (drums).

As sidemen or as a guest Gilles Renne had the opportunity to play with Rhoda Scott, Manu Dibango, Souad Massi, Linley Marthe, Dominique Di Piazza, Hadrien Ferraud, Jean-Philippe Fanfan, Stephane Huchard, Jean-Pierre Como, etc.  

In addition to his activities as a musician, he leads numerous workshops and master-classes around the world.

Discography 

GillesRenne has released or participated in more than thirty albums. Here below are the main ones.

As a leader or co-leader 

 Sellam-Renne Quartet, Rendez-vous,1990.
 Quoi neuf docteur (Big Band), Le retour , 1991.
 Sellam-Renne Quartet, Vent d'Est,1992.
 Quoi neuf docteur (Big Band), En attendant la pluie,1993.
 Sellam-Renne / African Project , Afrique (Live / tournée dans 7 pays d'Afrique centrale), 1993
 Sellam-Renne / African Project, Embrasse moi (Gabon), 1995
 Sellam-Renne / African Project, Traditional Odyssey avec le bassiste Lynley Marthe (Océan Indien), 1996
 Sellam-Renne / African Project, Abidjan (Côte d'Ivoire & Burkina Fasso), 1998
 Mister Hyde Quartet, Mister Hyde,1999
 Sellam-Renne / African Project, Live à Saint-Louis Sénégal, 2000
 Mister Hyde Quartet, Back to the beat, 2002
 Mister Hyde Quartet, Ultime atome Live, 2005
 Sellam-Renne / African Project, Sortilége  Live Paris ,2006
 Sellam- Renne / No Spirit, No Spirit (CD Live Paris + DVD Live in Séoul),  2008
 Sellam- Renne / No Spirit, Give me 5 , 2011
Jazz Runners "Funky ways" Live Paris, 2016
Hammond Legend " Black magic woman " , 2018
 Hammond Legend " Sittin' on the dock of the B3 " , 2020

As sideman

Quoi de Neuf Docteur (Big band) 

 Le retour , 1991.
 En attendant la pluie, 1993.

With Emmanuel Bex 

 Enfance, Bextet ,1991
 Harlem nocturne, Jean- Michel Proust, 1996

With Stefan Patry 

 Organic Jungle, 1998
 Live au Duc des Lombards , 2002
Singer ,2012

With Others 

 Rialzu (Rigiru 1978 / Réedition CD 2008)
 Tribute to the mother of groove (Philippe Combelle octet 2004)
Obrigado, René Sopa quintet, 2011

 Rose & Blues , Rose quartet,  2017

Films & DVD 

 DVD  "Live in Séoul" ( No Spirit - 2008 ).
 DVD  "African Project" ( Sellam-Renne - 2009 ).
 FILM "Venez jouer là" ( Jazz Runners - 2012).

References 

1954 births
Living people
People from Arles
French guitarists